Adrian Cortes Ugelvik (born 21 September 2001) is a Norwegian professional footballer who plays as a centre back for 2. divisjon club Levanger.

Career
Born in Norway, Ugelvik began his career with the youth team of Molde.

Molde
In 2017, Ugelvik was promoted to the second team of Molde.

Ugelvik was handed a professional contract and was promoted to the senior team of Molde.

He made his senior debut for Molde in a 1–4 away win against Spjelkavik in the Norwegian Football Cup.

Brattvåg
Ugelvik joined 2. divisjon club Brattvåg on a free transfer. He made his debut for the club in a 2–3 home defeat against Aalesunds in the Norwegian Football Cup.

Ugelvik scored his first goal for Brattvåg in a 2–3 away win against Senja in the 2. divisjon. He scored his second goal in a 2–0 home win against Alta.

Levanger
In December 2022, after spending two seasons with Brattvåg, it was announced that Ugelvik have signed for Levanger on a free transfer.

International career
Ugelvik was born in Norway to a Norwegian father and a Filipino mother making him eligible to play for either Norway or Philippines at international level.

Philippines
Ugelvik received a call up for the Philippines in the 2020 AFF Championship but eventually did not take part in the tournament due to injury.

References

External links

 

2001 births
Living people
Association football defenders
Citizens of the Philippines through descent
Norwegian people of Filipino descent
Filipino footballers
Norwegian footballers
Molde FK players
Brattvåg IL players